The Girl Irene is a 1936 German drama film directed by Reinhold Schünzel and starring Lil Dagover, Sabine Peters and Geraldine Katt. It is based on the British play Sixteen by Aimée Stuart about the widowed mother of a middle class family who falls in love, provoking the jealousy of her daughter. It was shot at the Babelsberg and Tempelhof Studios of AG|UFA in Berlin with location shooting taking place in London, Monte Carlo and Paris as well as around the German capital. The film's sets were designed by the art directors Ludwig Reiber and Walter Reimann.

Synopsis
In London, Jennifer Lawrence wishes to marry Sir John Corbett and first discusses it with her daughters Baba and Irene.  Irene, who idealized her own father, is greatly opposed, but her mother decides to marry anyway.  Irene runs away and tries to drown herself, but is saved, and Baba brings her home.  Her mother explains that her idealisation of her father was false, and Irene is reconciled.

Cast
 Lil Dagover as Jennifer Lawrence
 Sabine Peters as Irene Lawrence, ihre Tochter
 Geraldine Katt as Baba Lawrence, ihre Tochter
 Hedwig Bleibtreu as Großmutter
 Elsa Wagner as Frau König
 Karl Schönböck as Sir John Corbett
 Hans Richter as Philip
 Roma Bahn as Die Baronin
 Alice Treff as Lady Taylor
 Erich Fiedler as Bobby Cut
 Olga Limburg as Die Herzogin
 Gertrud Wolle as Die Lehrerin
 Georges Boulanger as Der Geiger
 Hilde Scheppan as Die Sängerin

References

Bibliography

External links 
 

1936 films
Films of Nazi Germany
German drama films
German black-and-white films
1936 drama films
1930s German-language films
Films directed by Reinhold Schünzel
German films based on plays
UFA GmbH films
Films set in London
Films shot in London
Films shot at Babelsberg Studios
Films shot at Tempelhof Studios
1930s German films